Trichocerapoda is a genus of moths of the family Noctuidae.

Species
 Trichocerapoda comstocki Benjamin, 1932
 Trichocerapoda harbisoni Mustelin, 2006
 Trichocerapoda oblita (Grote, 1877)
 Trichocerapoda oceanis Robertson & Mustelin, 2006
 Trichocerapoda strigata (Smith, 1891)

References
Natural History Museum Lepidoptera genus database
Trichocerapoda at funet
Moth Photographer's Group

Hadeninae